This table displays the top-rated primetime television series of the 2015–16 season as measured by Nielsen Media Research.

References

2015 in American television
2016 in American television
2015-related lists
2016-related lists
Lists of American television series